Fairhaven is an unincorporated community retirement community in Carroll County, Maryland, United States.

References

Unincorporated communities in Carroll County, Maryland
Unincorporated communities in Maryland
Retirement communities
Sykesville, Maryland